Milan Nitrianský (born 13 December 1990) is a professional Czech footballer who currently plays for FC Slavoj Vyšehrad. He has also represented his country at youth level.

Club career

Nitrianský has previously played for several clubs in the Czech league, including Slavia Prague, and Italian club Avellino with which he signed a three-year contract. The first match took place on 9 August against Casertana F.C. during the 2015–16 Coppa Italia at the Palermo stadium. On 15 August he disputed the last match against the S.S.D. Palermo which was won 2-0 by Avellino. On 2 March 2016 he decided to consensually resolve the contract with the club.

In July 2016 Nitriansky signed a contract with FC Slovan Liberec that played in the Czech First League. On 28 July he disputed its first match with the new team, replacing Daniel Bartl at the 78th minute of the Europa League winning match against the Austrian Admira Wacker Mödling. 
In January 2017 he moved to the Bohemians 1905 with which he made a first appearance on 15 March against Viktoria Plzeň.

He signed for Scottish Premiership club Partick Thistle on a one-year deal in August 2017. Nitriansky was released by Thistle on 31 January 2018, after making 7 appearances for the Jags.

International career

Nitrianský has represented the Czech Republic at youth level. He scored his first international goal at U-18 level in a 2–2 draw against Turkey in 2008. He participated in the 2013 UEFA European Under-21 Championship qualification campaign, scoring in an 8–0 win over Andorra.

Career statistics

References

External links
 
 Guardian Football
 

People from Prachatice
Living people
1990 births
Czech footballers
Czech Republic youth international footballers
Czech Republic under-21 international footballers
Czech expatriate footballers
SK Dynamo České Budějovice players
SK Slavia Prague players
FK Čáslav players
FC Slovan Liberec players
1. FK Příbram players
U.S. Avellino 1912 players
Partick Thistle F.C. players
Bohemians 1905 players
FK Slavoj Vyšehrad players
Czech First League players
Czech National Football League players
Scottish Professional Football League players
Serie B players
Association football defenders
Czech expatriate sportspeople in Italy
Expatriate footballers in Scotland
Expatriate footballers in Italy
Sportspeople from the South Bohemian Region